= Istanbul Technical University National Center for High Performance Computing =

Turkish computer study center

Istanbul Technical University National Center for High Performance Computing (ITU NCHPC), started in 2004 with the support of Prime Ministry State Planning Organization. The main goals of the National Center for High Performance Computing are to build awareness regarding to computational sciences and engineering in Turkey, and to make ready a computational infrastructure for scientific researches and R&D services.

The targeted user groups in NCHPC Center:

- Scientific researchers that are made in universities and public sector's research departments,
- R&D departments of industrial companies that need computational resources for their services,
- The projects of international research and application.
